P Saravana Kumar (born 26 August 1989) is an Indian cricketer. He made his Twenty20 debut on 8 November 2021, for Tamil Nadu in the 2021–22 Syed Mushtaq Ali Trophy, taking two wickets in the match. On 20 November 2021, in the semi-final match of the tournament against Hyderabad, Kumar took his first five-wicket haul in a T20 match, with Tamil Nadu winning by eight wickets to reach the final. He made his first-class debut on 17 February 2022, for Tamil Nadu in the 2021–22 Ranji Trophy.

References

External links
 

1989 births
Living people
Indian cricketers
Tamil Nadu cricketers
Place of birth missing (living people)